The National Science Institute (NSI), previously known as The Geek Group, was a not-for-profit educational organization based in Grand Rapids, Michigan with over 25,000 members around the world. The NSI sought to provide opportunity for all people through programs designed to foster lifelong education, vocational access, and creativity in technology. The group opened to the public on January 1, 2014.

The organizations President & Executive Director chose to close the organization on December 31, 2018 following a sealed search warrant executed by the United States Department of Homeland Security and three other federal agencies. After which Christopher Boden and Leesa B Vogt (AKA: Lis Bokt, Moose) started a Michigan non-profit organization called The Church of Tesla, an ecclesiastical society (which limits the IRS ability to conduct investigations of wrong doing), and continued providing similar information as the NSI did.  This new non-profit organization was using a lot of the items that were to be sold off or donated to other non-profits when the NSI was being dissolved to be in compliance with federal 501(c)3 non-profit dissolution rules. 

On February 24, 2021 an indictment was issued for Christopher Boden, charging him with Conspiracy to Operate an Unlicensed Money Transmitting Business, Operating an Unlicensed Money Transmitting Business, Conspiracy to Launder Money, 13 counts of Money Laundering, 10 counts of Structuring, and Attempted Collection of Debt by Extortionate Means.  After accepting a plea agreement, Christopher Boden was sentenced to 30 months in custody, 3 years of supervised release, and a $300 special assessment. The judgement was also made that Boden was to forfeit a sum of $75,000 to the federal government.

History 
The organization was started in 1996 at the Grand Valley State University in Allendale, Michigan as a group of friends, experimenting with university surplus equipment. They grew over a few years into a small company, The Geek Group, leasing a building in Grand Rapids at 344 Ionia Ave SW.  The Geek Group later moved to Kalamazoo and became a federally certified 501(c)(3) non-profit company. In early 2010 the Kalamazoo County Treasurer seized the organization's headquarters, which was then located in Kalamazoo Township, Michigan a suburb of Kalamazoo, MI after the organization refused to pay property taxes. The back taxes amounted to over $100,000  The organization appealed; however, the appeal was denied.

The organization moved back to Grand Rapids in December 2010 a  facility situated on Leonard Street NW, dubbed The Leonard Street Labs. On January 2, 2014, a fire partially destroyed the organization's High Voltage Lab, and deposited soot all over the lab. A grub screw on a Tesla coil rotary spark gap was not tight enough, allowing a tungsten electrode to move out of its socket and strike one of the stationary electrodes. This resulted in a chain reaction with molten tungsten being flung from the spark gap unit, which caused a nearby capacitor array to catch fire and subsequently melt. From preliminary analysis, Project Gemini (a 200,000 watt Tesla coil demonstration) looks to be the originating cause, and completely destroyed, and Project Thumper (a high impulse generator) was damaged. The fire was so hot it melted aluminum racks. Although no one had been hurt, the building was closed to the public once again for repairs.

On January 5, 2019, Chris Boden, the founder of the organization, was described as saying that the raid took place "because he was commercially trading in crypto-currency without the proper authorization", and that he believed he was facing prison.  On Sunday January 6 he stated that on the advice of his lawyer he would make no further comment.

Federal Raid and Aftermath 
On December 21, 2018 The National Science Institute's Laboratory at 902 Leonard Street NW was raided by Homeland Security, the IRS, and several other federal agencies. The raid was a result of conspiracy to operate an unlicensed Money Transmitting Business, operating an unlicensed Money Transmitting Business, money laundering, structuring, and attempting to collect a debt by means of extortion led by Chris Boden and Leesa Vogt.

After the raid, the founders decided that they were going to shut down operations and The National Science Institute permanently ceased operations on December 31, 2018.

On February 24, 2021, Mr. Boden was indicted on 28 federal counts including Conspiracy to Operate an Unlicensed Money Transmitting business, Operating an Unlicensed Money Transmitting Business, Conspiracy to Launder Money, Money Laundering, Structuring, and Attempted Collection of Debt by Extortionate Means. On October 18, 2021, Mr. Boden entered a guilty plea for 3 of the counts- Operating an Unlicensed Money Transmitting Business, Money Laundering, and Structuring. On February 25, 2022, Christopher Boden was sentenced to 30 months in federal custody, 3 years of supervised release, 150 hours of community service, and a $300 special assessment. The judgement was also made that Boden was to forfeit a sum of $75,000 to the federal government. 

Leesa B Vogt (AKA Lis Bokt) was sentenced to 3 years of supervised release, a $300 special assessment and forfeiture of $62,711. 

Daniel Dejager was sentenced to 10 months in federal custody, 3 years of supervised release, a $300 special assessment, and was ordered to forfeit a sum of $75,000 to the federal government. 

There was direct communication that was submitted as evidence of the wrong doing with regard to items in the indictment.   There is also audio recording of Mr. Boden speaking with an undercover agent posing as a drug dealer, Mr, Boden touted that he sold clean bitcoin, and never collected personal information regarding the sale to prevent laundering money.

Sponsors
The organization was sponsored by many companies, the majority of them small businesses local to the organization, but also some larger companies such as Rustoleum. The Group supplemented this donation income by charging for some research and development services.

YouTube popularity
The organization ran a YouTube channel, serving as an extension of their digital education program. As of 2018, the channel had over 94,000 subscribers and 650 videos. In addition to technical tool training videos, the channel regularly produced several educational video series, including equipment autopsies, machine tutorials and 'Your Dinosaurs Are Wrong'—a series describing how toy dinosaur models are usually incorrect.

References

External links
 Official website (archived copy)
 The Geek Group's YouTube channel

Educational organizations based in the United States
Charities based in Michigan
1994 establishments in Michigan